Black Stallion is a 2010 Malayalam Action Thriller Erotic film directed by Pramod Pappan. The film was produced by Jagadeesh Chandran and featuring Kalabhavan Mani, Bala and Namitha play the lead roles in this film. This is Namitha's first film in Malayalam. The film received a bunch of negative reviews from audience, by criticizing the film's imperfect making, story, dialogues, music, editing, cinematography, Kalabavan mani's bad heroism, cast performance, and adult content. The film was dubbed in Tamil as Nil Gavani.

Plot 
Black Stallion film starts from Irumban John, a dreaded don who terrorizes the town of Tirupur. His partner is the local cop Dominic Nadar who betrays him and his friend Nazer Hussain and he makes Nazer to kill John in a market fight where Dominic kills Nazer. John's son witnesses the crime. He tries to kill Dominic but it fails. He is taken to the juvenile jail and grows up to be another "Criminal Police" called Black. Later, he takes revenge by killing Nadar and soon becomes a notorious "thug in uniform". His catchphrase in the movie is "Clinjo".

Laura is a bar dancer, and Black falls for her and tries forcibly to make her, but she stabs him and runs away to Kochi along with her challenged sister.

In Kochi, she falls for the charms of a magazine photographer Ameer Usman and is soon madly in love with him. However, abhiram and his men are after her blood, and she is on the run. Now there is a twist in the tale as Ameer turns out to be the villain with the smiling cheek. Black was actually trying to save Laura from Ameer, who was actually a known pimp. He wants to sell Laura to rich foreigners. In the end, Black kills Ameer and wins Laura.

Cast 
 Kalabhavan Mani as Black Stallion / Clinjo
 Bala as Ameer Usman
 Namitha as Laura
 Ashish Vidhyarthi as Irumban John
 Rajan P. Dev as Sebastian Zacharia
 Augustine  as George Kichappilly/ Achayan
 Narayanankutty
 Besant Ravi as Nagaappan
 Jayan Cherthala as Gauri
 Kiran Raj
 Pawan as Perumal

Soundtrack 
Songs:
"The Sexy Lady"

References

2010 films
2010s Malayalam-language films
Indian erotic thriller films
2010 action thriller films
Indian action thriller films
Films shot in Coimbatore
Films shot in Kochi
Films directed by Pramod Pappan
Films scored by Ouseppachan